Demequina aestuarii is a bacterium from the genus of Demequina which has been isolated from tidal flat sediments from Korea.

References

Micrococcales
Bacteria described in 2007